Şebnem also spelled as Shabnam is a Turkish name (from ) meaning dew. It is very popular in Iran, Turkey, and Azerbaijan. Notable people with the name include:

Şebnem Dönmez (born 1974), Turkish actress and television host
Şebnem Ferah (born 1972), Turkish singer and songwriter
Şebnem Kimyacıoğlu (born 1983),Turkish women's basketball player
Şebnem Paker (born 1977), Turkish guitarist and singer
Jennifer Şebnem Schaefer (born 1984), Turkish-German model, actress and television presenter
Şebnem Taşkan (born 1994), Turkish-German footballer

Turkish feminine given names